Opsirhina lechriodes is a species of moth of the  family Lasiocampidae. It is found in New South Wales and Victoria.

The wingspan is about 40 mm.

The larvae feed on Eucalyptus species.

References

Lasiocampidae
Moths of Australia
Moths described in 1911